Teton Science Schools (TSS) is an educational organization located in northwest Wyoming and Idaho. TSS runs programs in field education, classroom education, and educator development. Founded in 1967, TSS began through teaching about the natural world and the Greater Yellowstone Ecosystem together through the study of nature and place-based education. Teton Science Schools serves students from across Wyoming, the Intermountain West, the nation and around the world. 

Teton Science Schools operate place-based programs for students, adults and families, wildlife expeditions, field science education programs, a graduate program in place-based field science education, education learning programs for teachers, and two independent schools. 

In 2015, the organization integrated the Murie Center, a nonprofit conservation organization located on the Murie Ranch in Moose, Wyoming.

Structure
Teton Science Schools is a private, 501(c)(3) non-profit educational organization, operating year-round in Jackson Hole, Wyoming in partnership with Grand Teton National Park and as a permittee of the Bridger-Teton National Forest.

Campuses

 Jackson Campus - the main campus is located on a 900-acre site in Jackson Hole, which include educational, residential and dining buildings. The Journeys School, a pre-K through 12th grade independent school operated by TSS, is located here.
 Kelly Campus - the original campus of TSS opened in 1973 in the Ramshorn Dude Ranch Lodge of the former Elbo Ranch inside Grand Teton National Park. Consisting of rustic log buildings preserved in an historic western setting, the site includes classroom, dining and residential buildings for students and participants in the Graduate Program. The Murie Museum houses a collection of over 600 bird study skins, over 1000 mammal study skins, skulls from almost every family of North American mammals and hundreds of plant specimens. 
 Murie Ranch - former home of the Murie Center, the site is associated with the conservationists Olaus Murie, his wife Margaret (Mardy) Murie and scientist Adolph Murie and his wife Louise.
 Teton Valley Community School - serves pre-K through 8th grade, located on a 10 acre-campus in Victor, Idaho

References

External links
 Teton Science Schools - official website

Outdoor education organizations
Jackson, Wyoming
Schools in Teton County, Wyoming
Environmental organizations based in Wyoming
Grand Teton National Park
Bridger–Teton National Forest
Organizations established in 1967
1967 establishments in the United States